End of Part One is a British television comedy sketch show written by David Renwick and Andrew Marshall; it was made by London Weekend Television. It ran for two series on ITV,  from 1979 to 1980 and was an attempt at a TV version of The Burkiss Way.  The first series concerned the lives of Norman and Vera Straightman, who had their lives interrupted by various television personalities of the day. The second series was mainly a straight succession of parodies of TV shows of the time, including Larry Grayson's Generation Game and Nationwide.

Cast
The cast included Sue Holderness, Denise Coffey, Fred Harris, Dudley Stevens, David Simeon, and Tony Aitken. Coffey had appeared in The Burkiss Way's first 6 episodes, but Harris was the only permanent cast member to appear in End of Part One. One of the directors was future feature film director Geoffrey Sax.

Episodes and scheduling

Both series were shown on Sunday afternoons. Series 1 was transmitted between 15 April and 27 May 1979 at 5.30pm with series 2 being transmitted between 12 October and 23 November 1980 at 4.00pm.

Marshall and Renwick blamed the show's relative lack of success due to it being shown in a Sunday afternoon timeslot, lamenting in an interview that it was "a show no-one knows about, at a time no-one would watch it anyway." In 1981, they decided not to write another series because LWT would not move it to a more favourable timeslot.

Repeats
Although End of Part One never received a network repeat, some ITV companies did repeat either or both series and in some cases, in the later timeslot originally envisaged by the writers.

Known repeat slots are:
 Anglia: October – December 1981, early evenings 
 Grampian:  30 June - 11 August 1981 at 5.15
 Scottish:  9 July – 27 August 1981, 6.30    + 
 LWT - July–August 1980 (series 1) and July–August 1981 (series 2), Friday nights 
 Southern: July –September 1981 
 TSW:  January–March 1982, Thursday afternoons
 Tyne Tees:  July–August 1981, 5.15.

Home release
The complete series was released on 5 November 2012 in a release on DVD from Network. All fourteen episodes are included.

References

External links
Comedy Guide - End of Part One at bbc.co.uk
 
 BFI.org

ITV sketch shows
1980s British television sketch shows
1970s British television sketch shows
1979 British television series debuts
1980 British television series endings
Television series about television
London Weekend Television shows
English-language television shows